Dr Siegfried Pfeiffer (19 October 188315 February 1959) was a Swiss international footballer. He played mainly as striker, but also as midfielder.

Between the years 1899 und 1908 Pfeiffer played a total of 72 games for FC Basel scoring a total of 28 goals. He was also member of the FC Basel board of directors. He presided the club's board during the 1907–08 season.

He also played for the Swiss national team. On 5 April 1908 Pfeiffer scored two goals in the legendary 5–3 victory over Germany at the Landhof in Basel. This was the first national team game for the Germans.

Sources and References

FC Basel players
Swiss men's footballers
Switzerland international footballers
Swiss football chairmen and investors
Association football midfielders
1883 births
1959 deaths